Ahmed Hassan Taleb (born 29 March 1980) is a Bahraini footballer how play as midfielder.

Club career
2001-2008      Al-Riffa

2008-2012      Al-Manama

2012–present   East Riffa

International career
He has made 41 appearances for the Bahrain national football team, scoring 4 goals.

National team career statistics

Goals for Senior National Team

References

External links

Living people
Bahraini footballers
Bahrain international footballers
1980 births
Footballers at the 2002 Asian Games
Association football midfielders
Asian Games competitors for Bahrain